I Am Hollywood is the first full-length studio album by American rock band He Is Legend. It was released November 2, 2004, on Solid State Records.

The album is a commentary on the darker side of the famous district of Hollywood, California. According to lead vocalist Schuylar Croom, "'I Am Hollywood' just mainly harps on the creepy side of the city that is acclaimed for making your dreams come true."

Track listing

Personnel 
He Is Legend
Schuylar Croom – vocals
Adam Tanbouz – lead guitar
Matty Williams – bass guitar
Steve Bache – drums, percussion
McKenzie Bell – rhythm guitar

Production
He Is Legend – producer
Adam Dutkiewicz – producer, engineer, mixing
Troy Glessner – mastering

Illustration and design
Ryan Clark – illustration and design
David Stuart – photography

References

External links 
 I Am Hollywood e-card
 Solid State Records official site

2004 debut albums
He Is Legend albums
Solid State Records albums
Albums produced by Adam Dutkiewicz